Huron School District is a school district headquartered in New Boston, Michigan.

Schools
 Huron High School
 Renton Junior High School
 Brown Elementary School
 Miller Elementary School

The district headquarters is connected to the high school.

References

External links
 Huron School District

School districts in Michigan
Education in Wayne County, Michigan
Education in Monroe County, Michigan